Simply Red Farewell – Live in Concert at Sydney Opera House is a live album by Simply Red that was released on 24 May 2011. It was recorded at the Sydney Opera House, in October 2010 during the Farewell Tour 2009 in support of their compilation album 25: The Greatest Hits.

The CD includes a DVD and Blu-ray Disc of the same concert but with 20 tracks.

Track listing

CD
 "Out on the Range" 5:51
 "Your Mirror" 4:10
 "Heaven" 5:08
 "Enough" 6:36
 "For Your Babies" 4:38
 "You Make Me Feel Brand New" 5:28
 "If You Don't Know Me by Now" 3:41
 "It's Only Love" 4:24
 "Sunrise" 3:27
 "Come to My Aid" 4:20
 "The Right Thing" 4:28
 "Money's Too Tight (To Mention)" 5:20
 "Stars" 4:06
 "Fairground" 6:01
 "Something Got Me Started" 4:30
 "Holding Back the Years" 4:45

DVD / Blu-ray
 "Out on the Range"
 "Your Mirror"
 "Jericho"
 "Heaven"
 "To Be with You"
 "Enough"
 "For Your Babies"
 "You Make Me Feel Brand New"
 "If You Don't Know Me by Now"
 "It's Only Love"
 "Sunrise"
 "Come to My Aid"
 "Fake"
 "The Right Thing"
 "Money's Too Tight (To Mention)"
 "Ain't That a Lot of Love"
 "Stars"
 "Fairground"
 "Something Got Me Started"
 "Holding Back the Years"

Charts

References

2011 albums
Simply Red albums
Albums recorded at the Sydney Opera House